Card manipulation is the branch of magical illusion that deals with creating effects using sleight of hand techniques involving playing cards. Card manipulation is often used to perform card tricks in magical performances, especially in close-up, parlor, and street magic. A person who practices card manipulation may be called a card sharp, card shark, or card mechanic.

Card manipulation techniques 
 Dealing
Bottom dealing
Second dealing
 Shuffling
 Faro shuffle
 False shuffling
 Zarrow shuffle
 Palming
 Back palm
 Gambler's palm
 Magician's palm
 Tenkai palm
 Other techniques
Card marking
 Double lift
 Herrmann pass
 Mechanic's grip
 Si Stebbins stack
Trick decks

Named card tricks 
 The Acme of Control
 Ambitious Card
 Blackstone's Card Trick Without Cards
 The Circus Card Trick
 The Four Burglars
 Out of This World
 Spelling Bee
 Twenty-One Card Trick

Other related concepts 
 Card throwing
 Cardistry

Magic tricks
Techniques
Sleight of hand
Entertainment lists